Teres II or  Teres III (Ancient Greek: Τήρης, Tērēs) was a king of the Odrysians in Thrace from 351 BC to 341 BC.

The variation in numbering indicates disagreement among scholars, some of whom include as Teres II the paradynast of Amadocus I and rival of Seuthes II who ruled near Byzantium in c. 400 BC, since that Teres is specifically called an Odrysian, and since Seuthes II himself was also a paradynast. The present Teres is therefore found variously as "Teres II"  or "Teres III"  in the literature.

Teres II or III is generally assumed to have been the son of Amadocus II, on the basis of historical succession and coin types. This identification is possibly supported by an inscription naming "Tērēs (son) of Amatokos" on a silver bowl found at the village of Braničevo in northeastern Bulgaria. Amadocus II, who ruled the central portion of Thrace, disappears from the sources at the time of a military intervention by Philip II of Macedon in 352/351 BC, and Teres appears to have succeeded him at this point. Since Demosthenes stated that Philip had "expelled some kings and replaced them with others," Teres may have come to the throne as Philip's appointee, although Demosthenes' statement is usually associated with the heirs of Berisades in western Thrace. During a subsequent Macedonian campaign in Thrace under Philip's general Antipater in 347/346 BC, Teres kept his throne, apparently allying with Philip against the eastern Thracian king Cersobleptes. This state of affairs lasted until Philip's later and more prolonged campaign in Thrace in 342–340 BC. After several victories over the Thracians, Philip subjugated the country, deposing both Teres and Cersobleptes, presumably in 341 BC.

On the basis of coin distribution and other circumstantial evidence, Teres has been identified as a kinsman (father?) and precursor of the later king Seuthes III, one of whose sons was also named Teres.

References 

 P. Delev, Thrace from the Assassination of Kotys I to Koroupedion (360-281 BCE), in Valeva et al. (eds.), A Companion to Ancient Thrace, Wiley, 2015: 48–58.
 A. Fol et al., The Rogozen Treasure, Sofia, 1989.
 G. Mihailov, The Inscriptions, in: Fol et al., The Rogozen Treasure, Sofia, 1989: 46–71.
 M. Tacheva, The Kings of Ancient Thrace. Book One, Sofia, 2006.
 S. Topalov, The Odrysian Kingdom from the Late 5th to the Mid-4th C. B.C., Sofia, 1994.
 S. Topalov, Contributions to the Study of the Coinage and History in the Lands of Eastern Thrace from the End of the 4th C. B.C. to the end of the 3rd C. B.C., Sofia, 2001.
 J. Valeva et al. (eds.), A Companion to Ancient Thrace, Wiley, 2015.
 R. Vulpe, Studia Thracologica, Bucharest, 1976.
 M. Zahrnt, Early History of Thrace to the Murder of Kotys I (360 BCE), in: J. Valeva et al. (eds.), A Companion to Ancient Thrace, Wiley, 2015: 35–47.

See also 
List of Thracian tribes
 

4th-century BC rulers
Odrysian kings